Dry Creek is a  stream in northern California which runs from the Sierra Nevada to the Mokelumne River west of Galt.

Tributaries 
North Fork Dry Creek
South Fork Dry Creek
Sutter Creek
Jackson Creek

See also 

 Borden Ranch AVA
 List of rivers of California

References 

Mokelumne River
Tributaries of the San Joaquin River
Rivers of Amador County, California
Rivers of San Joaquin County, California
Rivers of Sacramento County, California
Rivers of Northern California